Abdullah Sultan Alaryani (born 12 August 1970) is a sport shooter from the United Arab Emirates. He competed at the Summer Paralympics in 2008, 2012, 2016 and 2021 and in total, he won two gold medals and three silver medals.

Career 

In 2012, he won the gold medal in the mixed 50 metre rifle prone SH1 event at the Summer Paralympics in London, United Kingdom. He also represented the United Arab Emirates at the 2016 Summer Paralympics in Rio de Janeiro, Brazil and he won three silver medals in total.

In 2021, he represented the United Arab Emirates at the 2020 Summer Paralympics in Tokyo, Japan. He won the gold medal in the R7 Men's 50 metre rifle 3 positions SH1 event.

Personal life 

He became paralysed below the waist after a car crash in 2001.

References

External links 
 

Living people
1970 births
Place of birth missing (living people)
Emirati male sport shooters
Paralympic shooters of the United Arab Emirates
Shooters at the 2008 Summer Paralympics
Shooters at the 2012 Summer Paralympics
Shooters at the 2016 Summer Paralympics
Shooters at the 2020 Summer Paralympics
Medalists at the 2012 Summer Paralympics
Medalists at the 2016 Summer Paralympics
Medalists at the 2020 Summer Paralympics
Paralympic gold medalists for the United Arab Emirates
Paralympic silver medalists for the United Arab Emirates
Paralympic medalists in shooting
21st-century Emirati people